Local elections were held in most cities and municipalities of Serbia (excluding the disputed territory of Kosovo) on 24 April 2016, with repeat voting later taking place in some jurisdictions. The elections were held concurrently with the 2016 Serbian parliamentary election and the 2016 Vojvodina provincial election.

Elections were not held for the City Assembly of Belgrade, as its members were elected on a different four-year cycle (although local assembly elections were held in the City of Belgrade's constituent municipalities). Some other cities and municipalities also did not hold local elections in 2016, for the same reason.

All local elections in Serbia are held under proportional representation. Mayors are not directly elected but are instead chosen by elected members of the local assemblies. Parties were required to cross a five per cent electoral threshold (of all votes, not only of valid votes) in 2016, although this requirement was waived for parties representing national minority communities.

The Serbian Progressive Party's coalition, which won majority victories at the republic and provincial levels, also won most of the local elections.

Results

Belgrade
Local elections were held in all seventeen of Belgrade's municipalities. 

The Progressive Party and its allies finished first in fourteen municipalities and ultimately formed government in all fourteen. The three municipalities that the Progressives did not win were New Belgrade, Stari Grad, and Vračar. In New Belgrade, Aleksandar Šapić's independent list placed first, and Šapić was confirmed for a second term as mayor. In Stari Grad, the Democratic Party and its allies won the election and formed the local government. In Vračar, a multi-party coalition led by the Democratic Party narrowly defeated the Progressives, but the Progressives were able to form a government after splitting the coalition.

Barajevo
Results of the election for the Municipal Assembly of Barajevo:

Slobodan Bata Adamović of the Progressive Party was chosen as mayor after the election. The local coalition government was formed by the Progressives, the Socialists, and Rade Tanasijević's Accord movement.

Čukarica
Results of the election for the Municipal Assembly of Čukarica:

Incumbent mayor Srđan Kolarić of the Progressive Party was confirmed for another term in office after the election, with the support of twenty-nine delegates. The local governing alliance consisted of the Progressives, Socialists, and Radicals.

Grocka
Results of the election for the Municipal Assembly of Grocka:

The DS list did not receive five per cent of all votes cast and so did not cross the electoral threshold.

Dragoljub Simonović of the Progressive Party was chosen as mayor after the election. He resigned amid controversy in March 2019 and was replaced by Živadinka Avramović.

Lazarevac
Results of the election for the Municipal Assembly of Lazarevac:

Bojan Sinđelić of the Progressive Party was selected as mayor after the election, with the support of thirty-five delegates (out of thirty-nine who attended the session). The members of the Lazarevac–Out Home list were not present for the vote. Although the selection of a Progressive Party representative as mayor was expected, the choice of Sinđelić was surprising to many.

Mladenovac
Results of the election for the Municipal Assembly of Mladenovac:

Vladan Glišić of the Progressive Party (not to be confused with the future parliamentarian of the same name) was chosen as mayor after the election, with the support of thirty-eight delegates. The Socialist Party supported the administration.

New Belgrade
Results of the election for the Municipal Assembly of New Belgrade:

Incumbent mayor Aleksandar Šapić was confirmed for another term in office with the support of twenty-six out of forty-seven delegates.

Branka Stamenković was elected from the fourth position on the Enough Is Enough list.

Obrenovac
Results of the election for the Municipal Assembly of Obrenovac:

The Private Citizens of Obrenovac list did not receive five per cent of the total vote and so did not cross the electoral threshold.

Incumbent mayor Miroslav Čučković of the Progressive Party was confirmed for another term in office after the election.

Palilula
Results of the election for the Municipal Assembly of Palilula:

Aleksandar Jovičić of the Progressive Party was selected as mayor after the election, which the support of thirty-four delegates. The local coalition government was formed by the Progressives, Socialists, and Radicals.

Rakovica
Results of the election for the Municipal Assembly of Rakovica:

Incumbent mayor Vladan Kocić of the Progressive party was confirmed for a new term in office, receiving the votes of thirty delegates. The local coalition government was formed by the Progressives and the Socialists. Zoran Krasić was elected at the head of the Radical Party list, although he resigned his mandate on 15 September 2016.

Savski Venac
Results of the election for the Municipal Assembly of Savski Venac:

Irena Vujović of the Progressive Party was chosen as mayor after the election. The local coalition government included the Progressives and the Socialists. Social Democratic Party member Nenad Konstantinović was elected from the lead position on the Democratic Party alliance list; parliamentarian Nataša Vučković was re-elected as a Democratic Party candidate on the same list. Srđan Nogo, at the time a member of Dveri, appeared in the fifth position on the Democratic Party of Serbia–Dveri list and was not elected.

Sopot
Results of the election for the Municipal Assembly of Sopot:

Živorad Milosavljević of the Progressive Party, who had served as mayor of Sopot since 1989, was confirmed for another term in office after the election.

Stari Grad
Results of the election for the Municipal Assembly of Stari Grad:

Marko Bastać, at the time a member of the Democratic Party, was chosen as mayor by a secret ballot in May 2016 with the support of thirty-eight delegates. The Socialist Party participated in the local coalition government. The Progressives and Enough Is Enough subsequently indicated they would serve in opposition. There was some confusion as to which other parties supported the coalition. Future parliamentarian Uglješa Marković of the Socialist Party received a mandate on 29 September 2016 and served for the remainder of the term..

Surčin
Results of the election for the Municipal Assembly of Surčin:

The Movement for a Rich Municipality of Surčin list did not receive five per cent of the total vote and so fell below the electoral threshold.

Stevan Šuša of the Progressive Party was subsequently chosen as mayor, with the support of twenty-two delegates.

Voždovac
Results of the election for the Municipal Assembly of Voždovac:

Incumbent mayor Aleksandar Savić of the Progressive Party was confirmed for another term in office after the election, by a vote of thirty-nine to fifteen. The local administration was supported by the Progressives, Socialists, and Radicals, as well as the Our Voždovac group (which split from the Dveri–Democratic Party of Serbia list).

Vračar
Results of the election for the Municipal Assembly of Vračar:

The Free Vračar alliance did not remain united after the election, and Milan Nedeljković of the Progressive Party was selected as mayor with the support of twenty-three delegates. The local coalition government was formed by the Progressive Party, the Socialist Party, the Liberal Democratic Party, and the Democratic Party of Serbia. The opposition parties boycotted the vote.

Vojin Biljić was elected from the fifth position on the Enough Is Enough list.

Zemun
Results of the election for the Municipal Assembly of Zemun:

Incumbent mayor Dejan Matić of the Progressive Party was confirmed for a new term in office after the election. The Serbia Is Winning list formed a local coalition government with the Radical Party. Aleksandar Šešelj, who was elected to the assembly at the head of the Radical Party list, served as a member of the municipal council (i.e., the executive branch of the government) from 17 June 2016 to 27 October 2017.

Zvezdara
Results of the election for the Municipal Assembly of Zvezdara:

Miloš Ignjatović of the Progressive Party was chosen as mayor after the election, with the support of twenty-nine delegates. The government was supported by the Socialists and the Mirijevo list.

Vojvodina

Central Banat District
Local elections were held in the one city (Zrenjanin) and all four of the municipalities in the Central Banat District. The Progressive Party and its allies won majority victories in Zrenjanin and Sečanj and plurality victories in Novi Bečej and Žitište. An independent list won the election in Nova Crnja; the leader of the list joined the Progressive Party after the election.

Zrenjanin
Results of the election for the City Assembly of Zrenjanin:

Incumbent mayor Čedomir Janjić of the Progressive Party was confirmed in office after the election, with the support of the Socialists and the Alliance of Vojvodina Hungarians.

Nova Crnja
Results of the election for the Municipal Assembly of Nova Crnja:

Incumbent mayor Pera Milankov joined the Progressive Party after the election and was confirmed for another term as mayor. In 2018, he was convicted of giving and accepting bribes and given a prison sentence of one year and ten months; as the sentence was not final pending an appeal, he continued to serve as mayor. He was dismissed in June 2019 and replaced by fellow Progressive Party member Vladimir Brakus.

Novi Bečej
Results of the election for the Municipal Assembly of Novi Bečej:

Saša Maksimović of the Progressive Party was chosen as mayor after the election, with support from the Alliance of Vojvodina Hungarians and members of Milovoj Vrebalov's group.

Sečanj
Results of the election for the Municipal Assembly of Sečanj:

Incumbent mayor Predrag Milošević of the Progressive Party was confirmed for another term in office after the election. He died on 15 April 2017 and was replaced by Predrag Rađenović, also of the Progressive Party.

Žitište
Results of the election for the Municipal Assembly of Žitište:

Incumbent mayor Mitar Vučurević of the Progressive Party was confirmed for another term in office after the election.

North Bačka District
Local elections were held in the one city (Subotica) and both of the municipalities in the North Bačka District. The Progressive Party won plurality victories in Subotica and Mali Iđoš, while the Alliance of Vojvodina Hungarians was successful in Bačka Topola (where the Progressives joined a coalition government after the election).

Subotica
Results of the election for the City Assembly of Subotica:

Bogdan Laban of the Serbian Progressive Party was chosen as mayor after the election. The Progressives and their allies governed in a coalition with the Alliance of Vojvodina Hungarians.

Bačka Topola
Results of the election for the Municipal Assembly of Bačka Topola:

Incumbent mayor Gabor Kišlinder of the Alliance of Vojvodina Hungarians was confirmed for a new term in office after the election. The government was formed by the Alliance of Vojvodina Hungarians and the Serbian Progressive Party.

Mali Iđoš
Results of the election for the Municipal Assembly of Mali Iđoš:

Marko Lazić of the Progressive Party was chosen as mayor after the election.

North Banat District
Local elections were held in the one city (Kikinda) and all five municipalities of the North Banat District. The Progressive Party and its allies won a majority victory in Kikinda as well as plurality victories in Čoka and Novi Kneževac, forming government in all three jurisdictions. The Alliance of Vojvodina Hungarians won plurality victories Kanjiža and Senta and in both cases formed a coalition government with the Progressives. An independent list won in Ada; its leader joined the Progressives later in the year.

Kikinda
Results of the election for the City Assembly of Kikinda:

Incumbent mayor Pavle Markov of the Progressive Party was confirmed for another term in office after the election. The Alliance of Vojvodina Hungarians participated in the city's coalition government.

Ada
Results of the election for the Municipal Assembly of Ada:

Incumbent mayor Zoltán Bilicki of the For Our Municipality list was confirmed for another term in office after the election. He joined the Progressive Party in December 2016.

Čoka
Results of the election for the Municipal Assembly of Čoka:

Stana Đember of the Progressive Party was chosen as mayor after the election. The government was formed by the Progressives and the Alliance of Vojvodina Hungarians.

Kanjiža
Results of the election for the Municipal Assembly of Kanjiža:

Róbert Fejsztámer of the Alliance of Vojvodina Hungarians was chosen as mayor after the election. The Progressive Party participated in the local government.

Novi Kneževac
Results of the election for the Municipal Assembly of Novi Kneževac:

Radovan Uverić of the Progressive Party was chosen as mayor after the election.

Senta
Results of the election for the Municipal Assembly of Senta:

Incumbent mayor Rudolf Czegledi of the Alliance of Vojvodina Hungarians was confirmed for another term in office after the election. The Progressive Party participated in the local government.

South Bačka District
Local elections were held in the one city (Novi Sad) and ten of the eleven separate municipalities of the South Bačka District. The exception was Vrbas, which was on a different four-year electoral cycle at the time.

The City of Novi Sad comprises two municipalities (the City municipality of Novi Sad and Petrovaradin), although their powers are very limited relative to the city government. Unlike Belgrade, Niš, and Vranje, Novi Sad does not have directly elected municipal assemblies.

The Progressive Party and its allies placed first in all cities and municipalities that held elections, and members of the Progressive Party were subsequently chosen as mayors in all jurisdictions.

Novi Sad
Results of the election for the City Assembly of Novi Sad:

Incumbent mayor Miloš Vučević of the Progressive Party was confirmed for a second term in office after the election, by a vote of fifty-two to twenty-two (with four invalid votes). The government was supported by the Progressives, the Socialists, and the League of Social Democrats. Milorad Mirčić, who served as the city's mayor in the 1990s, was re-elected to the assembly from the second position on the Radical Party list. Parliamentarian Nada Lazić received the fifteenth position on the League of Social Democrats of Vojvodina list and was not elected.

Bač
Results of the election for the Municipal Assembly of Bač:

Incumbent mayor Dragan Stašević of the Progressive Party was confirmed for another term in office after the election. He was replaced by Borislav Antonić of the same party on 10 October 2017.

Bačka Palanka
Results of the election for the Municipal Assembly of Bačka Palanka:

Branislav Šušnica of the Progressive Party was chosen as mayor after the election.

Bački Petrovac
Results of the election for the Municipal Assembly of Bački Petrovac:

Srđan Simić of the Progressive Party was chosen as mayor after the election.

Bečej
Results of the election for the Municipal Assembly of Bečej:

Incumbent mayor Vuk Radojević of the Progressive Party was confirmed for another term in office after the election, with the support of twenty-eight of the thirty-three delegates who were present. He was replaced later in the year by Dragan Tošić of the same party.

Beočin
Results of the election for the Municipal Assembly of Beočin:

Mitar Milinković of the Progressive Party was chosen as mayor after the election.

Srbobran
Results of the election for the Municipal Assembly of Srbobran:

Neško Čestić of the Progressive Party was chosen as mayor after the election. He was replaced by his party colleague Radivoj Paroški on 6 July 2017.

Sremski Karlovci
Results of the election for the Municipal Assembly of Sremski Karlovci:

Nenad Milenković of the Progressive Party was chosen as mayor after the election.

Temerin
Results of the election for the Municipal Assembly of Temerin:

Incumbent mayor Đuro Žiga of the Progressive Party was confirmed for another term in office after the election.

Titel
Results of the election for the Municipal Assembly of Titel:

Dragan Božić of the Progressive Party was chosen as mayor after the election.

Vrbas
There was no election for the Municipal Assembly of Vrbas in 2016. The previous election had taken place in 2013; the next election took place in 2017.

Žabalj
Results of the election for the Municipal Assembly of Žabalj:

Incumbent mayor Čedomir Božić and his independent group joined the Progressives after the election, and Božić was confirmed for another term in office.

South Banat District
Local elections were held in the two cities (Pančevo and Vršac) and five of the six other municipalities of the South Banat District. The exception was Kovin, where the previous election had been held in 2013 and the next election was held in 2017. The Progressive Party and its allies won majority victories in all jurisdictions that held elections except Vršac and Bela Crkva, where they won plurality victories. In all jurisdictions that held elections, the Progressive Party emerged as the dominant party in the local government.

Pančevo
Results of the election for the City Assembly of Pančevo:

Incumbent mayor Saša Pavlov of the Serbian Progressive Party was confirmed for another term in office after the election.

Marinika Tepić was elected from the lead position on the list of the League of Social Democrats of Vojvodina. She was also elected to the national assembly and resigned her seat in the local parliament on 4 July 2016.

Alibunar
Results of the election for the Municipal Assembly of Alibunar:

Incumbent mayor Predrag Belić of the Serbian Progressive Party was confirmed for another term in office after the election. He was replaced by Dušan Dakić of the same party in July 2018.

Bela Crkva
Results of the election for the Municipal Assembly of Bela Crkva:

Incumbent mayor Darko Bogosavljević of the Serbian Progressive Party was chosen for another term in office after the election.

Kovačica
Results of the election for the Municipal Assembly of Kovačica:

Milan Garašević of the Serbian Progressive Party was chosen as mayor after the election.

Kovin
There was no municipal election in Kovin in 2016. The previous election had taken place in 2013, and the next election took place in 2017.

Opovo
Results of the election for the Municipal Assembly of Opovo:

Zoran Tasić of the Serbian Progressive Party was chosen as mayor after the election.

Plandište
Results of the election for the Municipal Assembly of Plandište:

Jovan Repac of the Serbian Progressive Party was chosen as mayor after the election.

Vršac
Results of the election for the City Assembly of Vršac:

Dragana Mitrović of the Serbian Progressive Party was chosen as mayor after the election.

West Bačka District
Local elections were held in the one city (Sombor) and two of the other three municipalities in the West Bačka District. The exception was Odžaci, where the most recent local election had taken place in 2013. The Serbian Progressive Party and its allies won the elections and formed government in all jurisdictions that held elections.

Sombor
Results of the election for the City Assembly of Sombor:

Dušanka Golubović of the Progressive Party was chosen as mayor after the election. Parliamentarian Žika Gojković was elected to the assembly from the first position on the SPO list; he resigned his seat on 22 June 2016.

Parliamentarian Zlata Đerić led the New Serbia list.

Apatin
Results of the election for the Municipal Assembly of Apatin:

Radivoj Sekulić of the Progressive Party was chosen as mayor after the election. He was replaced by Milan Škrbić of the same party in January 2017.

Kula
Results of the election for the Municipal Assembly of Kula:

Perica Videkanjić of the Progressive Party was chosen as mayor after the election. He stood down in May 2018 and was replaced by Velibor Milojičić, who in turn resigned in September of the same year, prompting new local elections. After resigning, Milojočić served as leader of a provisional administration.

Odžaci
There was no election for the Municipal Assembly of Odžaci in 2016. The previous election had taken place in 2013 and the next election took place in 2017.

Šumadija and Western Serbia

Moravica District
Local elections were held in the one city (Čačak) and two of the three other municipalities in the Moravica District. The Progressive Party and its allies were successful in all three of the jurisdictions that held elections.

Čačak
Results of the election for the City Assembly of Čačak:

Milun Todorović of the Progressive Party was chosen as mayor following the election, with the support of forty-six delegates. Biljana Rubaković, who briefly served in the national assembly, was elected from the third position on Dveri's list.

Gornji Milanovac
Results of the election for the Municipal Assembly of Gornji Milanovac:

Dejan Kovačević of the Progressive Party was chosen as mayor after the election.

Ivanjica
Results of the election for the Municipal Assembly of Ivanjica:

Zoran Lazović of the Progressive Party was chosen as mayor after the election.

Lučani
There was no election for the Municipal Assembly of Lučani in 2016. The previous election had taken place in 2014, and the next took place in 2018.

Pomoravlje District
Local elections were held in the one city (Jagodina) and all five other municipalities of the Pomoravlje District. United Serbia won a majority victory in its home base of Jagodina in an alliance with the Socialist Party of Serbia. The Progressive alliance won majority victories in Ćuprija and Despotovac, and it was ultimately able to form a stable coalition government in Rekovac as well.

The Democratic Party won and formed government in Paraćin, and an independent list won and formed government in Svilajnac.

Jagodina
Results of the election for the City Assembly of Jagodina:

Incumbent mayor Ratko Stevanović of United Serbia was confirmed for another term in office after the election.

Ćuprija
Results of the election for the Municipal Assembly of Ćuprija:

Incumbent mayor Ninoslav Erić of the Serbian Progressive Party was confirmed for another term in office after the election.

Despotovac
Results of the election for the Municipal Assembly of Despotovac:

Nikola Nikolić of the Serbian Progressive Party was chosen as mayor after the election.

Paraćin
Results of the election for the Municipal Assembly of Paraćin:

Incumbent mayor Saśa Paunović of the Democratic Party was confirmed for another term in office after the election. He left the party in early 2020 and served as an independent.

Rekovac
Results of the election for the Municipal Assembly of Rekovac:

Pavle Mijajlović of the Serbian Progressive Party was chosen as mayor after the election with the support of seventeen delegates. The government initially consisted of the Progressives (whose ranks had expanded after the vote via flyovers) and the Social Democratic Party. This administration fell after only thirty-two days, and a new government was briefly formed in June 2022 by the Socialist Party of Serbia, United Serbia, and the Democratic Party; Predrag Đorđević of the Socialist Party of Serbia served as mayor. This administration, too, fell shortly thereafter, and Aleksandar Đorđević of the Progressives was chosen as mayor in July 2016, leading a coalition government with United Serbia.

Svilajnac
Results of the election for the Municipal Assembly of Svilajnac:

Incumbent mayor Predrag Milanović was confirmed for another term in office after the election, leading a coalition government that comprised his own independent list and the Socialist Party of Serbia.

Gorica Gajić of the Democratic Party of Serbia appeared in the lead position on her party's coalition list with Dveri. The list received 4.99% of the total votes cast in the municipality (including invalid votes) and thereby missed the electoral threshold by the narrowest of margins.

Rasina District
Local elections were held in the one city (Kruševac) and all five other municipalities of the Rasina District. The Serbian Progressive Party and its allies won a majority victory in Kruševac; the Progressive alliance also won plurality victories in Trstenik and Varvarin, and in each case formed government afterward.

Milutin Jeličić led New Serbia to a majority victory in Brus; he joined the Progressive Party in 2017. Jugoslav Stajkovac's independent list won a majority victory in Aleksandrovac; when he retired in 2019, he was replaced by a member of the Progressive Party.

The only municipality where the Progressives did not hold power by 2020 was Ćićevac, where Zlatan Krkić's independent group had won a majority victory.

Kruševac
Results of the election for the City Assembly of Kruševac:

Incumbent mayor Dragi Nestorović of the Serbian Progressive Party was confirmed for another term in office after the election. He died on 21 October 2017. On 25 December 2017, Jasmina Palurović of the Progressive Party was chosen as his successor.

Aleksandrovac
Results of the election for the Municipal Assembly of Aleksandrovac:

Incumbent mayor Jugoslav Stajkovac was confirmed for another term in office after the election. He retired in March 2019 and was replaced by Mirko Mihajlović  of the Serbian Progressive Party.

Brus
Results of the election for the Municipal Assembly of Brus:

Incumbent mayor Milutin Jeličić of New Serbia was confirmed for another term in office after the election. In August 2017, he joined the Serbian Progressive Party.

Jeličić announced his resignation as mayor on 1 March 2019 after being charged with sexual harassment. He was replaced by Saśa Milošević, also of the Progressive Party.

Ćićevac
Results of the election for the Municipal Assembly of Ćićevac:

Incumbent mayor Zlatan Krkić was confirmed for another term in office after the election, leading an administration that included his own independent list and New Serbia.

Trstenik
Results of the election for the Municipal Assembly of Trstenik:

Aleksandar Ćirić of the Serbian Progressive Party was chosen as mayor after the election, leading an administration that also included the Socialist Party of Serbia and the Serbian Renewal Movement.

Miroslav Aleksić, who had served as mayor in the previous term, was re-elected to the assembly at the lead of the Together With the People coalition list. In 2017, he allowed his People's Movement of Serbia to be reconstituted as the People's Party under Vuk Jeremić's leadership and became a vice-president of the new party.

Varvarin
Results of the election for the Municipal Assembly of Varvarin:

Vojkan Pavić of the Serbian Progressive Party was chosen as mayor after the election with the support of twenty-six delegates.

Raška District
Local elections were held in the two cities (Kraljevo and Novi Pazar) and the three other municipalities of the Raška District. The Serbian Progressive Party and its allies won in the predominantly Serb municipalities of Kraljevo, Raška, and Vrnjačka Banja. The Sandžak Democratic Party won in the predominantly Bosniak city of Novi Pazar, while the Party of Democratic Action of Sandžak won in Tutin, also a predominantly Bosniak community.

Kraljevo
Results of the election for the City Assembly of Kraljevo:

Predrag Terzić of the Serbian Progressive Party was chosen as mayor after the election.

Novi Pazar
Results of the election for the City Assembly of Novi Pazar:

Nihat Biševac of the Sandžak Democratic Party was chosen as mayor after the election.

Parliamentarian Enis Imamović was elected from the lead position on the SDA list. He resigned on 27 June 2016.

Candidates elected on the Bosniak Democratic Union of Sandžak list included Chief Mufti Muamer Zukorlić (#1 on the list), party leader Jahja Fehratović (#2), Misala Pramenković (#3), and Amela Lukač Zoranić (#6).

Raška
Results of the election for the Municipal Assembly of Raška:

Incumbent mayor Ignjat Rakitić of the Serbian Progressive Party was confirmed for another term in office after the election.

Tutin
Results of the election for the Municipal Assembly of Tutin:

Incumbent mayor Šemsudin Kučević of the Party of Democratic Action of Sandžak was confirmed for another term in office after the election. He died in a car accident in October 2017. The following month, the assembly chose Kenan Hot, also of the Party of Democratic Action of Sandžak, as his replacement.

Bajro Gegić was elected from the second position on the Party of Democratic Action of Sandžak list. Zaim Redžepović was elected from the second position on the Bosniak Democratic Union of Sandžak list.

Vrnjačka Banja
Results of the election for the Municipal Assembly of Vrnjačka Banja:

Incumbent mayor Boban Đurović of the Serbian Progressive Party was confirmed for another term in office after the election.

Šumadija District
Local elections were held in the one city (Kragujevac) and five of the six other municipalities of the Šumadija District. The exception was Aranđelovac, where the last election had been held in 2014. 

The Progressives and their allies won plurality victories in Kragujevac, Batočina, and Knić and formed government in all three communities. In Topola, an alliance led by the Progressives and New Serbia won a majority victory. The Serbian Renewal Movement won a narrow plurality victory in Lapovo and formed a coalition government with the Progressives; a member of the Serbian Renewal Movement initially served as mayor but was replaced by a Progressive Party member in 2017.

The Social Democratic Party won a narrow victory in Rača; shortly after the election, the party's entire elected membership joined the Progressives.

Kragujevac
Results of the election for the City Assembly of Kragujevac:

Incumbent mayor Radomir Nikolić of the Progressive Party was confirmed for another term in office after the election.

The local party New Strength (Nova Snaga) contested the election on the list of the Social Democratic Party. Party leader and future parliamentarian Nikola Nešić received the seventh position on the SDS's list; he was not immediately elected, but he received a mandate on 6 June 2016 as the replacement for another member.

Aranđelovac
There was no election for the Municipal Assembly of Aranđelovac in 2016. The previous election had taken place in 2014, and the next took place in 2018.

Batočina
Results of the election for the Municipal Assembly of Batočina:

Zdravko Mladenović of the Progressive Party was chosen as mayor after the election.

Knić
Results of the election for the Municipal Assembly of Knić:

Zoran Đorović of the Progressive Party was chosen as mayor after the election. He resigned in July 2018 and was replaced by Miroslav Nikolić of the same party.

Lapovo
Results of the election for the Municipal Assembly of Lapovo:

Saša Ivković of the Serbian Renewal Movement was chosen as mayor after the election, in an alliance with the Progressive Party. The Serbian Renewal Movement split in 2017, and Ivković and his assembly group joined the breakaway Movement for the Restoration of the Kingdom of Serbia. He stood down as mayor on 21 September 2017 and was replaced by Boban Miličić of the Progressive Party.

Rača
Results of the election for the Municipal Assembly of Rača:

Nenad Savković of the Social Democratic Party was chosen as mayor after the election. Shortly thereafter, the Social Democratic Party's entire municipal board (including Savković) resigned its membership. They later joined the Progressives.

Topola
Results of the election for the Municipal Assembly of Topola:

Incumbent mayor Dragan Živanović of New Serbia was confirmed for another term in office after the election. Dragan Jovanović was chosen as speaker of the assembly.

New Serbia split in early 2017, Jovanović formed a new party called Better Serbia. Živanović sided with Jovanović and became a member of the party.

Zlatibor District
Local elections were held in the one city (i.e., Užice) and eight of the nine separate municipalities of the Zlatibor District. The exception was Kosjerić, where the previous local election had taken place in 2013.

The Serbian Progressive Party's coalition won majority victories in Užice and Priboj as well as plurality victories in Arilje, Bajina Bašta, Nova Varoš, Požega, and Prijepolje; in all of these municipalities, Progressive Party delegates were chosen as mayor. Milan Stamatović of the Serbian People's Party led his alliance to a majority victory in Čajetina, and the Party of Democratic Action of Sandžak won in Sjenica.

The city of Užice is divided into two municipalities: Užice and Sevojno. The municipality of Užice does not have direct assembly elections: members of the city assembly also serve at the municipal level. Delegates to the Municipal Assembly of Sevojno are directly elected, although there was no election in 2016; the previous vote had taken place in 2014.

Užice
Results of the election for the City Assembly of Užice:

Incumbent mayor Tihomir Petković of the Serbian Progressive Party was confirmed for another term in office after the election.

Užice: Sevojno
There was no election for the Municipal Assembly of Sevojno in 2016. The previous election had taken place in 2014, and the next election took place in the 2018.

Arilje
Results of the election for the Municipal Assembly of Arilje:

Incumbent mayor Zoran Todorović of the Progressive Party was confirmed for another term in office after the election. He resigned in September 2018 and was replaced by Miloš Nedeljković of the same party.

Bajina Bašta
Results of the election for the Municipal Assembly of Bajina Bašta:

Incumbent mayor Radomir Filipović of the Serbian Progressive Party was confirmed for another term in office after the election with the support of thirty-seven delegates.

Čajetina
Results of the election for the Municipal Assembly of Čajetina:

Incumbent mayor Milan Stamatović of the Serbian People's Party (SNP) was confirmed for another term in office after the election. He left the SNP in 2017 and founded the Healthy Serbia party.

Bojana Božanić of the Serbian People's Party was elected to the assembly from the third position on the SNP's coalition list. She resigned her seat on 1 October 2020.

Kosjerić
There was no municipal election in Kosjerić in 2016. The previous election had taken place in 2013, and the next election took place in 2017.

Nova Varoš
Results of the election for the Municipal Assembly of Nova Varoš:

Branko Bjelić of the Serbian Progressive Party was chosen as mayor after the election. The government was supported by the Progressive alliance, the Sandžak Democratic Party (SDP), and the Socialist Party of Serbia. A Progressive delegate later defected to the opposition, and in September 2016 a new administration was formed with Radosav Vasiljević as mayor. Vasiljević's administration was supported by his own citizens' group, the Democratic Party, and New Serbia.

Vasiljević formed a new coalition with the Progressives in 2017 and later joined the party.

Požega
Results of the election for the Municipal Assembly of Požega:

Incumbent mayor Milan Božic of the Progressive Party was confirmed for another term in office after the election. He was removed from office in June 2019 after being arrested and was replaced by Đorđe Nikitović of the same party.

Priboj
Results of the election for the Municipal Assembly of Priboj:

Incumbent mayor Lazar Rvović of the Serbian Progressive Party was confirmed for another term in office after the election. Incumbent delegate and future parliamentarian Dijana Radović was elected from the third position on the Socialist list; she resigned her position on 15 June 2016.

Prijepolje
Results of the election for the Municipal Assembly of Prijepolje:

Dragoljub Zindović of the Serbian Progressive Party was chosen as mayor after the election, with the support of twenty-five delegates.

Samir Tandir of the Bosniak Democratic Union of Sandžak was elected from the lead position on the BDZ Sandžak–LDP list.

Sjenica
Results of the election for the Municipal Assembly of Sjenica:

Incumbent mayor Hazbo Mujović of the Party of Democratic Action was confirmed for another term in office after the election.

Southern and Eastern Serbia

Nišava District
Local elections were held for the City Assembly of Niš, the assemblies in all five of Niš's constituent municipalities, and the assemblies in all six of the Nišava District's other municipalities.

The Progressive Party and its allies won all of the elections in Niš. Outside the city, the results were mixed. The Progressives were successful in Aleksinac and Doljevac, and a coalition of the Progressives and United Peasant Party won in Svrljig. The Progressives also won the election in Merošina, although local divisions in the party led to an unstable governing alliance in the years that followed. The Socialists won Gadžin Han, and incumbent mayor Dobrica Stojković led New Serbia to a rare majority victory in Ražanj.

Niš
Results of the election for the City Assembly of Niš:

Darko Bulatović of the Progressive Party was chosen as mayor following the election, with the support of forty-six delegates.

Niš: Crveni Krst
Results of the election for the Municipal Assembly of Crveni Krst:

Incumbent mayor Miroslav Milutinović of the Progressive Party was confirmed in office for another term, by a unanimous vote of the delegates present.

Niš: Medijana
Results of the election for the Municipal Assembly of Medijana:

Milan Krstić of the Progressive Party was chosen as mayor after the election. The government was formed by the Progressives, the Socialists, and the "Sincerely for Niš" group. Krstić resigned in September 2017 and was replaced by Nebojša Kocić, who had previously left the Democratic Party to join the Progressives.

Niš: Niška Banja
Results of the election for the Municipal Assembly of Niška Banja:

Dejan Jovanović of the Progressive Party was chosen as mayor after the election.

Niš: Palilula
Results of the election for the Municipal Assembly of Palilula, Niš:

Aleksandar Ždrale of the Progressive Party was chosen as mayor after the election with the support of twenty-two delegates.

Niš: Pantelej
Results of the election for the Municipal Assembly of Pantelej:

Bratimir Vasiljević of the Progressive Party was chosen as mayor after the election.

Aleksinac
Results of the election for the Municipal Assembly of Aleksinac:

Incumbent mayor Nenad Stanković of the Progressive Party was confirmed for another term in office after the election.

Doljevac
Results of the election for the Municipal Assembly of Doljevac:

Incumbent mayor Goran Ljubić of the Progressive Party was confirmed for another term in office after the election.

Gadžin Han
Results of the election for the Municipal Assembly of Gadžin Han:

Incumbent mayor Saša Đorđević of the Socialist Party was confirmed for another term in office after the election, with the support of the Democratic Party. He stood down in March 2019 following a recalibration of political forces in the community; his replacement was Marija Cvetković, a former Socialist who had joined the Progressives.

Merošina
Results of the election for the Municipal Assembly of Merošina:

There were several changes in the municipal administration of Merošina between 2016 and 2020, amid ongoing divisions in the ranks of the Progressive Party's local organization.

Sanja Stajić of the Progressives was chosen as mayor after the election. She was replaced by Saša Jovanović of the same party in February 2018. The administration was reshuffled in May 2018, and Bojan Nešić was chosen as the municipality's new mayor – Nešić had been elected on the "Naprednjaci" list, which by this time had affiliated itself with the Socialist Party. The "Naprednjaci" group later merged into the Progressives. In September 2018, Nešić resigned as mayor and Jovanović returned to office. The municipal assembly was ultimately dissolved in August 2019, and Sanja Stajić was named as president of an interim administration that governed the municipality until new elections were held in 2020.

Ražanj
Results of the election for the Municipal Assembly of Ražanj:

Incumbent mayor Dobrica Stojković of New Serbia was confirmed for another term in office after the election. He left the party later in the term.

Svrljig
Results of the election for the Municipal Assembly of Svrljig:

Incumbent mayor Jelena Trifunović of the United Peasant Party was confirmed for another term in office after the election.

Podunavlje District
Local elections were held in the one city (Smederevo) and the two other municipalities of the Podunavlje District. The Serbian Progressive Party and its allies won majority victories in all three jurisdictions.

Smederevo
Results of the election for the City Assembly of Smederevo:

Incumbent mayor Jasna Avramović of the Serbian Progressive Party was confirmed for another term in office after the election.

Smederevska Palanka
Results of the election for the Municipal Assembly of Smederevska Palanka:

Petar Milić of the Serbian Progressive Party was chosen as mayor after the election. The local Progressive organization subsequently experienced serious internal divisions, and in December 2016 a new coalition government was formed with Toplica Pintorović, also of the Progressives, chosen as mayor. These divisions ultimately prevented the functioning of the local government, and in October 2017 the municipal assembly was dissolved. Nikola Vučen of the Progressives was chosen as leader of a provisional government, pending new elections in 2018.

Velika Plana
Results of the election for the Municipal Assembly of Velika Plana:

Incumbent mayor Igor Matković of the Serbian Progressive Party was confirmed for another term in office after the election.

Former mayor Dejan Šulkić of the Democratic Party of Serbia led the Our Municipality in the First Place list and was re-elected to the assembly.

Notes

References

Local elections in Serbia
2016 elections in Serbia
April 2016 events in Europe